In molecular biology, glycoside hydrolase family 46 is a family of glycoside hydrolases.

Glycoside hydrolases  are a widespread group of enzymes that hydrolyse the glycosidic bond between two or more carbohydrates, or between a carbohydrate and a non-carbohydrate moiety. A classification system for glycoside hydrolases, based on sequence similarity, has led to the definition of >100 different families. This classification is available on the CAZy web site, and also discussed at CAZypedia, an online encyclopedia of carbohydrate active enzymes.

Glycoside hydrolase family 46 CAZY GH_46 comprises enzymes with only one known activity; chitosanase. Chitosanase enzymes catalyse the endohydrolysis of beta-1,4-linkages between N-acetyl-D-glucosamine and D-glucosamine residues in a partly acetylated chitosan.

References 

EC 3.2.1
GH family
Protein families